Alcoholism: Clinical and Experimental Research is a scientific journal covering research concerning alcohol abuse and its treatment. It is published by Wiley-Blackwell on behalf of the Research Society on Alcoholism and the International Society for Biomedical Research on Alcoholism.

Abstracting and indexing 
The journal is abstracted and indexed in Academic Search, Current Awareness in Biological Sciences, Biological Abstracts, BIOSIS Previews, CAB Abstracts, CAB HEALTH, CABDirect, CSA Biological Sciences Database, Current Contents, EMBASE, EMBiology, Index Medicus/MEDLINE/PubMed, Neuroscience Citation Index, Psychological Abstracts/PsycINFO, Science Citation Index, and Scopus. According to the Journal Citation Reports, the journal has a 2020 impact factor of 3.455, ranking it 12th out of 21 journals in the category "Substance Abuse".

References

External links
 

Publications established in 1977
Addiction medicine journals
Wiley-Blackwell academic journals
English-language journals
Monthly journals
Alcohol abuse